Tauredophidium hextii is a species of cusk-eel found in the Indian and western Pacific Oceans. This species grows to a length of  SL. It is the only known member of its genus. The specific name honours Rear-Admiral John Hext (1842-1924) who was commander of the Royal Indian Marine who supported the expedition in board the R.I.M.S. Investigator in the Arabian Sea which collected the type specimen.

References

Ophidiidae
Monotypic fish genera
Fish described in 1890